Java Soundsfair was a music festival based in Jakarta, Indonesia. The only edition was held for three days, 24–26 October 2014 and it was held at Jakarta Convention Center. The event was promoted by Java Festival Production.

Line-ups
All information taken from the website. Headline performers are listed in Boldface.

2014
Friday, 24 October

Saturday, 25 October

Sunday, 26 October

References

Music festivals in Indonesia
Music festivals established in 2014